Murder Creek is a stream in the U.S. state of Georgia.

According to tradition, Murder Creek received its name in the late 1700s when a robbery and murder occurred near its banks.

References

Rivers of Georgia (U.S. state)
Rivers of Jasper County, Georgia
Rivers of Newton County, Georgia
Rivers of Putnam County, Georgia